Helen Street police station, also known as Govan police station, in the Craigton (greater Govan) district of Glasgow, is the most secure police station in Scotland. It is used for example for detaining suspects arrested under the Terrorism Act.

The fortified station, situated just south of the M8 motorway, is operated by Police Scotland, and is the base of the Major Crime and Terrorism Investigation Unit for Scotland.

It was built on the site of White City Stadium, used for greyhound racing and motorcycle speedway until the 1970s.

Suspected criminals detained and questioned at Govan
 Bilal Abdulla, arrested after the 2007 Glasgow International Airport attack
 Andy Coulson, Conservative Party political strategist and Downing Street Director of Communications under Prime Minister David Cameron, charged with perjury during HM Advocate v Sheridan and Sheridan
 Nazzedine Menni, the only person charged in connection with the 2010 Stockholm bombings
 Mohammed Atif Siddique

See also 
 Paddington Green Police Station
 Anti-terrorism legislation
 Terrorism Acts

Police stations in Scotland
Law enforcement in Scotland
Government buildings in Glasgow
Terrorism in Scotland
Govan